David Buchbinder (born 1947) is professor of Masculinities Studies at Curtin University in Perth, Western Australia, and adjunct professor of English and Cultural Studies at the University of Western Australia.

Education 
Buchbinder gained his doctorate in English literature from Cornell University in 1974, his thesis was based on an old-spelling edition of the Jacobean play, The Tragedy of Sir John van Olden Barnavelt.

Bibliography

Books 
  With a chapter on poetry and gender by Barbara H. Milech.
 
 
 
 
 

Editor

References

External links 
 Official website

1947 births
Cornell University alumni
Academic staff of Curtin University
Living people
Male feminists
Men's movement
Men and masculinities scholars
Academic staff of the University of Western Australia